The 2016 Swiss Open Gstaad (also known as the 2016 J. Safra Sarasin Swiss Open Gstaad for sponsorship reasons) was a men's tennis tournament played on outdoor clay courts. It was the 49th edition of the Swiss Open, and part of the ATP World Tour 250 Series of the 2016 ATP World Tour. It took place at the Roy Emerson Arena in Gstaad, Switzerland, from 18 July through 24 July 2016.

Singles main draw entrants

Seeds 

 1 Rankings are as of July 11, 2016

Other entrants 
The following players received wildcards into the singles main draw:
  Antoine Bellier 
  Henri Laaksonen 
  Johan Nikles 

The following players received entry from the qualifying draw:
  Tristan Lamasine 
  Yann Marti 
  Jan Mertl 
  Thiago Monteiro

The following player received entry as a lucky loser:
  Agustín Velotti

Withdrawals 
Before the tournament
  Santiago Giraldo →replaced by  Marco Chiudinelli

Retirements 
  Denis Istomin

Doubles main draw entrants

Seeds 

 Rankings are as of July 11, 2016

Other entrants 
The following pairs received wildcards into the doubles main draw:
  Andre Begemann /  Robin Haase
  Antoine Bellier /  Henri Laaksonen

Champions

Singles 

  Feliciano López def.  Robin Haase, 6–4, 7–5

Doubles 

  Julio Peralta /  Horacio Zeballos def.  Mate Pavić /  Michael Venus, 7–6(7–2), 6–2

External links 
 

Swiss Open Gstaad
Swiss Open (tennis)
2016 in Swiss tennis